Rafael Garza Gutiérrez (13 December 1896 – 3 July 1974), nicknamed "Récord", was a Mexican football player and coach. He, along with other members of the Garza family, are recognized as the founders of Club América. He was a defender for that club as well as the Selección de fútbol de México (Mexico national team). Upon retiring, he took the reins of his beloved club as an executive and later served as the national team manager on four separate occasions.. He is an Olympian.

Club América 
Garza Gutiérrez, and a group of young men, championed the idea of a Club América when on 12 October 1916 (Columbus Day; Spanish, "Día del descubrimiento de America"/"Day of the discovery of America"), met. There existed Garza's "Récord" (which would later become his personal nickname) and Germán Nuñez's "Unión"; they consolidated forces. The name came from the significance of the day on which the club was established.

Garza continued in 1917 to be a force when América was "promoted" to compete in Liga Mayor de la Ciudad (Major League of Mexico City). Garza led América to four consecutive championships (player in 1924–25; and player/coach in 1925–26, 1926–27, 1927–28). America would have its next league championship in 1965–66.He retired from America in 1932.

Mexico national football team 
Garza's early success brought him to the attention of those that championed the idea of a national team to represent Mexico in international competition. This team would be governed by Mexican Football Federation (FEMEXFUT), when it was created in 1927. Garza was elected to be the team's first head coach, although he had been informally coaching what was then the team since 1923. He continued at his post until 1928. He played as a defender at the first FIFA World Cup, held in Uruguay in 1930. After his retirement as a player, he continued to coach the Mexico national team three times (1934–35, 1937 and 1949).

1928 Olympic Summer Games - Amsterdam
He was on the football team sent by Mexico to compete at the 1928 Olympic Summer.

Honours

Player

América 
Primera División: 1924–25, 1925–26, 1926–27, 1927–28

 Copa Challenger: 1927

Managerial

América 
Primera División: 1926–27, 1927–28

International 
NAFC Championship: 1949

References

External links
 
 Stats as a player
 Chronologic list of Mexico National Team coaches

1896 births
1974 deaths
Footballers from Mexico City
Association football defenders
Mexican footballers
Mexico international footballers
Olympic footballers of Mexico
1930 FIFA World Cup players
Club América footballers
Mexican football managers
Club América managers
Mexico national football team managers
Footballers at the 1928 Summer Olympics